Mark Dawes (born 1983) is an English international lawn and indoor bowler and a four times world indoor champion.

Bowls career
He won the Men's National Junior title in 2005 at the National Championships. By 2014 he had reached a career high world indoor ranking of 8.

In 2018 he won the World Indoor Open Pairs title with Jamie Chestney. and then followed this by taking the World Open Singles Championship, defeating Robert Paxton in a hard fought final. Dawes had been the player of the tournament and Paxton did well to take the final to a tie break. He was subsequently named as the singles first seed at the 2019 World Indoor Bowls Championship.

In 2020 his indoor club Blackpool Newton Hall BC permanently closed and Dawes was forced to find a new club.

Despite the loss of his club he won a third world indoor title when winning the open pairs at the 2021 World Indoor Bowls Championship for the second time with Jamie Chestney. Dawes then reproduced his good form to win the singles event for the second time, defeating Greg Harlow in the final 10-3 11-5 and record a fourth world indoor title in total.

References

1983 births
Living people
English male bowls players
Indoor Bowls World Champions